In medicine, excavation has two meanings:
the act of hollowing out
the space hollowed out, or a natural cavity or pouch

Examples of the latter include:
Rectouterine pouch or excavation, between the uterus and the rectum
Rectovesical excavation, between the rectum and the male bladder
Vesicouterine excavation, between the bladder and the uterus in a female

Medical terminology